The 49th New York State Legislature, consisting of the New York State Senate and the New York State Assembly, met from January 3 to April 18, 1826, during the second year of DeWitt Clinton's second tenure as Governor of New York, in Albany.

Background
Under the provisions of the New York Constitution of 1821, 32 Senators were elected on general tickets in eight senatorial districts for four-year terms. They were divided into four classes, and every year eight Senate seats came up for election. Assemblymen were elected countywide on general tickets to a one-year term, the whole Assembly being renewed annually.

In 1824, Orleans County was split from Genesee County, and was apportioned 1 seat in the Assembly, taken from Genesee.

After the controversy about the presidential succession had come to an end with the election of John Quincy Adams, the factions of the Democratic-Republican Party re-aligned into "Bucktails" (led by U.S. Senator Martin Van Buren) and "Clintonians" (supporters of Gov. DeWitt Clinton).

Elections
The State election was held from November 7 to 9, 1825. Peter R. Livingston (2nd D.), John L. Viele (4th D.), Charles Stebbins (5th D.), Peter Hager 2d (6th D.), Truman Hart (7th D.), Ethan B. Allen (8th D.); and Assemblymen Joshua Smith (1st D.) and Ambrose L. Jordan (3rd D.) were elected to the Senate. Smith, Livingston, Stebbins and Hager were Bucktails, the other four were Clintonians.

Sessions
The Legislature met for the regular session at the Old State Capitol in Albany on January 3, 1826, and adjourned on April 18.

Samuel Young (Buckt.) was elected Speaker with 65 votes against 54 for Ex-Mayor of New York City Stephen Allen who was a Bucktail but received the votes of the Clintonians. Edward Livingston was again elected Clerk of the Assembly with a vote of 66 to 55.

On January 3, State Senator Jasper Ward stated in the Senate that, during the recess of the Legislature, he had been falsely accused in the press of corrupt proceedings to get two bills passed during the previous session, and demanded an official investigation. The issue was referred to a Select Senate Committee.

On January 14, the Legislature elected  Chancellor Nathan Sanford to the seat in the U.S. Senate which had been vacant since Rufus King's term expired on March 4, 1825.

On February 14, the Legislature re-elected State Comptroller William L. Marcy, Attorney General Samuel A. Talcott and Surveyor General Simeon De Witt; and elected Azariah C. Flagg to succeed John Van Ness Yates as Secretary of State; and Abraham Keyser, Jr. to succeed Gamaliel H. Barstow (Clint.) as New York State Treasurer. De Witt was a Clintonian, the other four elected officers were Bucktails.

On February 25, Silas Wright, Jr. submitted the Select Committee's report and offered a resolution that Jasper Ward be expelled from the Senate for corruption. Before the resolution was put to a vote, on March 1, Jasper Ward resigned his seat, and no further action was taken by the Senate.

On March 29, the State Road Commissioners, Jabez D. Hammond, Nathaniel Pitcher and George Morell, submitted their report on the project to build a road through the Southern Tier. Two routes were proposed: the "Northern Route" from Lake Erie via Bath, Ithaca, Unadilla, Delhi and Madison to Athens or Catskill; and the "Southern Route" from Lake Erie via Bath, Painted Post, New Town, Binghamton, Delaware Co., Sullivan Co. and Orange Co. to Nyack. The project was rejected by a vote of 48 to 50, and no State Road was built.

On April 18, the Legislature amended the senatorial district apportionment: Delaware Co. was transferred from the 6th to the 2nd District; and Steuben Co. was transferred from the 8th to the 6th District.

At this session, it was enacted that Justices of the Peace should henceforth be elected townwide by popular ballot, instead of being appointed.

State Senate

Districts
The First District (4 seats) consisted of Kings, New York, Queens, Richmond and Suffolk counties.
The Second District (4 seats) consisted of Dutchess, Orange, Putnam, Rockland, Sullivan, Ulster and Westchester counties.
The Third District (4 seats) consisted of Albany, Columbia, Greene, Rensselaer, Schenectady and Schoharie counties.
The Fourth District (4 seats) consisted of Clinton, Essex, Franklin, Hamilton, Montgomery, St. Lawrence, Saratoga, Warren and Washington counties.
The Fifth District (4 seats) consisted of Herkimer, Jefferson, Lewis, Madison, Oneida and Oswego counties.
The Sixth District (4 seats) consisted of Broome, Chenango, Cortland, Delaware, Otsego, Tioga and Tompkins counties.
The Seventh District (4 seats) consisted of Cayuga, Onondaga, Ontario, Seneca, Wayne and Yates counties.
The Eighth District (4 seats) consisted of Allegany, Cattaraugus, Chautauqua, Erie, Genesee, Livingston, Monroe, Niagara, Orleans and Steuben counties.

Note: There are now 62 counties in the State of New York. The counties which are not mentioned in this list had not yet been established, or sufficiently organized, the area being included in one or more of the abovementioned counties.

Members
The asterisk (*) denotes members of the previous Legislature who continued in office as members of this Legislature. Joshua Smith and Ambrose L. Jordan changed from the Assembly to the Senate.

Employees
Clerk: John F. Bacon

State Assembly

Districts

Albany County (3 seats)
Allegany County (1 seat)
Broome County (1 seat)
Cattaraugus County (1 seat)
Cayuga County (4 seats)
Chautauqua County (1 seat)
Chenango County (3 seats)
Clinton County (1 seat)
Columbia County (3 seats)
Cortland County (2 seats)
Delaware County (2 seats)
Dutchess County (4 seats)
Erie County (1 seat)
Essex County (1 seat)
Franklin County (1 seat)
Genesee County (3 seats)
Greene County (2 seats)
Hamilton and Montgomery counties (4 seats)
Herkimer County (3 seats)
Jefferson County (3 seats)
Kings County (1 seat)
Lewis County (1 seat)
Livingston County (2 seats)
Madison County (3 seats)
Monroe County (3 seats)
The City and County of New York (10 seats)
Niagara County (1 seat)
Oneida County (5 seats)
Onondaga County (4 seats)
Ontario County (3 seats)
Orange County (4 seats)
Orleans County (1 seat)
Oswego County (1 seat)
Otsego County (4 seats)
Putnam County (1 seat)
Queens County (2 seats)
Rensselaer County (4 seats)
Richmond County (1 seat)
Rockland County (1 seat)
St. Lawrence County (1 seat)
Saratoga County (3 seats)
Schenectady County (1 seat)
Schoharie County (2 seats)
Seneca County (2 seats)
Steuben County (2 seats)
Suffolk County (2 seats)
Sullivan County (1 seat)
Tioga County (2 seats)
Tompkins County (2 seats)
Ulster County (3 seats)
Warren County (1 seat)
Washington (4 seats)
Wayne County (2 seats)
Westchester County (3 seats)
Yates County (1 seat)

Note: There are now 62 counties in the State of New York. The counties which are not mentioned in this list had not yet been established, or sufficiently organized, the area being included in one or more of the abovementioned counties.

Assemblymen
The asterisk (*) denotes members of the previous Legislature who continued as members of this Legislature. Tilly Lynde changed from the Senate to the Assembly.

Employees
Clerk: Edward Livingston
Sergeant-at-Arms: Chester Griswold
Doorkeeper: William Seely
Assistant Doorkeeper: James D. Scollard

Notes

Sources
The New York Civil List compiled by Franklin Benjamin Hough (Weed, Parsons and Co., 1858) [see pg. 109 and 441 for Senate districts; pg. 126 for senators; pg. 148f for Assembly districts; pg. 203f for assemblymen]
The History of Political Parties in the State of New-York, from the Ratification of the Federal Constitution to 1840 by Jabez D. Hammond (4th ed., Vol. 2, Phinney & Co., Buffalo, 1850; pg. 206 to 230)

049
1826 in New York (state)
1826 U.S. legislative sessions